Patrick Nagle (born September 21, 1987) is an American professional ice hockey goaltender who is currently playing for the  Lehigh Valley Phantoms of the American Hockey League (AHL).

Playing career
On March 22, 2011, the Tampa Bay Lightning signed the undrafted free agent to a two-year entry-level contract. He played NCAA hockey at Ferris State University prior to turning professional.

In his first professional season in 2011–12, with the Florida Everblades, Nagle shared primary goaltending duties with John Muse, playing 39 games. During the playoffs, Nagle recorded the best goals against average and tied for first in save percentage, at 1.42 and .941, respectively. After winning the Kelly Cup, Nagle was called up to the AHL for the Lightning organization's affiliate, the Norfolk Admirals, during their Calder Cup championship series against the Toronto Marlies.

On August 27, 2013, Nagle agreed as a free agent to a one-year AHL contract with the Texas Stars, the affiliate of the Dallas Stars. After training camp with the Stars, Nagle did not make the club and was assigned to their ECHL affiliate, the Idaho Steelheads for the duration of the 2013-14 season, winning a career-high 23 of 43 games.

On July 21, 2014, Nagle opted to remain in the ECHL, signing a one-year deal with the Fort Wayne Komets. On January 12, 2015, the Grand Rapids Griffins signed Nagle to a professional try out. Before signing a professional tryout with the Griffins, he recorded a 17–4–1 record, a 2.42 GGA, and a .910 save percentage in 22 games with the Fort Wayne Komets this season. On February 5, 2015, Nagle was released from his professional tryout, and returned to the Fort Wayne Komets. Nagle made his first start for the Griffins on January 23, in a game against the Utica Comets, earning his first career AHL win. In three AHL games this season, Nagle recorded a 1–1–0 record, 1.76 goals against average, and a 0.948 save percentage. During the 2014–15 season, Nagle posted a 23–7–2 record, 2.48 GAA and a .907 save percentage with the Fort Wayne Komets. He also made two appearances with the Rochester Americans and one with the Utica Comets.

On July 22, 2015, the Fort Wayne Komets re-signed Nagle. On December 9, 2015; the Grand Rapids Griffins signed Nagle to a professional try out. Before signing a professional tryout with the Griffins, he recorded a 5–4–0 record, with a 2.51 GAA and a .910 save percentage in 10 games with the Fort Wayne Komets this season.

Nagle played two further seasons with the Komets before signing a one-year AHL contract to return to the Grand Rapids Griffins on July 27, 2017. Nagle was named the Warrior Hockey/ECHL Goaltender of the Month for November 2017. He recorded a 7–1–1 record, with a 2.66 GAA and a .907 save percentage in nine games during the month. He was also named ECHL Goaltender of the Week for the week ending November 6 after going 3–0–0 with a 2.03 GAA and a .933 save percentage in three appearances.

After three seasons in the Griffins organization, Nagle continued his career in the AHL as a free agent, agreeing to a one-year deal with the Lehigh Valley Phantoms, affiliate to the Philadelphia Flyers, on September 17, 2021.

International play
In January 2022, he was named to the United States men's national ice hockey team for the 2022 Winter Olympics. He served as the teams third choice goaltender and did not feature in the tournament.

Career statistics

Awards and honours

References

External links

1987 births
American men's ice hockey goaltenders
Ferris State Bulldogs men's ice hockey players
Florida Everblades players
Fort Wayne Komets players
Grand Rapids Griffins players
Ice hockey players from Michigan
Idaho Steelheads (ECHL) players
Lehigh Valley Phantoms players
Living people
People from Bloomfield, Oakland County, Michigan
Reading Royals players
Rochester Americans players
Syracuse Crunch players
Toledo Walleye players
Utica Comets players
AHCA Division I men's ice hockey All-Americans
Ice hockey players at the 2022 Winter Olympics
Olympic ice hockey players of the United States